Stefan Fröhlich (7 October 1889 – 2 October 1978) was an Austrian general during World War II. He was a recipient of the Knight's Cross of the Iron Cross of Nazi Germany.

Life
Fröhlich at age 15 enlisted in the Austro-Hungarian army in the pioneer cadet school. At the onset of the First World War, he was a 1st Lieutenant and served predominantly on the Italian Front. Following the end of hostilities, Fröhlich remained in the Austrian army, eventually serving in the Vienna Federal Ministry for the Army as a clerk for engineering. In 1933 he took part in a pilot training course and was subsequently transferred to the "air raid command". In December 1937, he became the commandant of the newly established flying school regiment at the Zeltweg Air Base. After the annexation of Austria, he transferred over to the Luftwaffe. During the Second World War, he served on all major fronts and eventually retired on April 30, 1945, eight days prior to the end of hostilities.

Awards and decorations

 Knight's Cross of the Iron Cross on 4 July 1940 as Generalmajor and commander of Kampfgeschwader 76

References

Citations

Bibliography

1889 births
1978 deaths
Austro-Hungarian Army officers
Austro-Hungarian military personnel of World War I
Banat Swabians
Generals of Aviators
Luftwaffe World War II generals
People from Orșova
Recipients of the clasp to the Iron Cross, 2nd class
Recipients of the Gold German Cross
Recipients of the Knight's Cross of the Iron Cross
Recipients of the Silver Medal of Military Valor